Mangue, Mangué or Mangüé may refer to:

People
Mangué Camara (b. 1982), Guinean footballer
Mangué Cissé (1945–2009), Ivorian footballer
Constancia Mangue (b. 1951), First Lady of Equatorial Guinea
Emiliana Mangue, Equatoguinean footballer
Florencio Mayé Elá Mangue (b. 1942), Equatorial Guinean military leader
Gerardo Angüe Mangue, Equatoguinean political activist
Marta Mangué (b. 1983), Spanish handball player
Ricardo Mangue Obama Nfubea (b. 1961), Equatoguinean politician
Ruth Mangue (b. 1975), Equatoguinean sprinter.
Teodoro Nguema Obiang Mangue (b. 1968), Vice President of Equatorial Guinea

Places
Giramangu, village in India also known as Mangue or Mangyu
Mangyu temple complex, located near Giramangu, India
Mangue, Cape Verde
Estádio de Mangue, stadium in Mangue, Tarrafal, Cape Verde
Mangue Grande, commune of Angola
Porto do Mangue, municipality in Rio Grande do Norte, Brazil

Other uses
Crossarchus, genus of mongoose known as mangue
Mangue people, ethnic group in Nicaragua
Mangue language, an extinct Oto-Manguean language of Nicaragua, Honduras, and Costa Rica
Manguean languages, a subgroup of the Oto-Manguean languages that includes the Mangue, Chorotega and Chiapanec languages
Mangue bit, a Brazilian music style
"Castillo mangüé", a Cuban street song
"Mango mangüé", song by Francisco Fellove